Crai may refer to:

 Crai (village), Welsh village and community
 Afon Crai, a river that runs through the Welsh community
 Crai (supermarket), Italian cooperative society
 Crai (record label), Wales
 Crai Nou, a village in Romania